Cold Lake Regional Airport  is located  northwest of Cold Lake, Alberta, Canada.

See also
CFB Cold Lake

References

External links
Page about this airport on COPA's Places to Fly airport directory
Official site

Registered aerodromes in Alberta
Municipal District of Bonnyville No. 87